Sonthar Gyal (born 1974) is a Tibetan film director in People's Republic of China. His films include The Sun Beaten Path (2011) and River (2015).

Biography
Sonthar Gyal was born in Tongde County, Hainan Tibetan Autonomous Prefecture, Qinghai. His father was a primary school teacher who was the first person to graduate from college in the region. Sonthar Gyal studied at the Tsolho Nationalities Teacher Training College in Hainan (Tsolho) Prefecture and taught in the nomadic community for four years. Afterwards he received a scholarship to study fine arts at the Qinghai Normal University in Xining. After graduating in 2003 with a B.A. in Fine Arts, he worked as an art teacher and a curator at the Tongde Cultural Museum.

Although he grew up on the grassland with very few opportunities to watch films (and the ones he watched were in Chinese) he became so fascinated by films that he began to collect scraps of films after each open-air showing. Later, encouraged by his friend Pema Tseden who also hails from Hainan Prefecture, Sonthar Gyal followed him to the prestigious Beijing Film Academy, where he studied cinematography for 2 years with the support of Trace Foundation. Upon graduation, he worked as a cinematographer and artistic director for a series of films and documentaries, many directed by Pema Tseden. He made his directorial debut in 2011 with The Sun Beaten Path.

Filmography

Awards and nominations

References

External links

 
 

Tibetan film directors
Living people
1974 births
People from Hainan Prefecture
Beijing Film Academy alumni
Chinese cinematographers
Film directors from Qinghai